The 2022–23 Akron Zips men's basketball team represented the University of Akron during the 2022–23 NCAA Division I men's basketball season. The Zips, led by sixth-year head coach John Groce, played their home games at the James A. Rhodes Arena in Akron, Ohio as members of the Mid-American Conference. As the third seed they defeated Buffalo in the first round of the MAC tournament before losing to Kent State to finish 22–11 and 13–5 in MAC play

Previous season

The Zips finished the 2022–23 season 24–10 overall, 14–6 in MAC Play to finish in a tie for third place.  As the No. 4 seed, they defeated Buffalo, Toledo, and Kent State to win the MAC tournament. They received the conference’s automatic bid to the NCAA tournament as the No. 13 seed in the East Region, where they lost in the first round to UCLA.

Offseason

Departures

Incoming transfers

Recruiting class

Roster

Schedule and results

|-
!colspan=9 style=|Non-conference regular season

|-
!colspan=9 style=| MAC regular season

|-
!colspan=9 style=| MAC tournament

Source

References

Akron Zips men's basketball seasons
Akron
Akron Zips men's basketball
Akron Zips men's basketball